Two steamships have been named SS Iron Monarch:

 , renamed Hatsu Maru and while at anchor in Manila Bay, Philippines on 13 November 1944, she was attacked by United States Navy carrier aircraft and sunk.
 , broken up October 1972.

See also
 

Ship names